{{Speciesbox
| image = 
| image_caption = 
| genus = Dalea
| species = elegans
| authority = Hook. & Arn.or Gillies ex Hook. & Arn.
| subdivision_ranks = Subspecies
| subdivision = 
 Dalea elegans var. elegans Hook. & Arn.
 Dalea elegans var. onobrychioides (Griseb.) Barneby
| synonyms_ref = 
| synonyms = 
 Dalea eosina (J.F. Macbr.) J.F. Macbr.
 Dalea onobrychioides(( Griseb.
 Dalea stenophylla Griseb.
 Parosela elegans (Gillies ex Hook. & Arn.) J.F. Macbr.
 Parosela eosina J.F. Macbr.
}}Dalea elegans''  is a species of flowering plants in the legume family, Fabaceae. It is found in Argentina and Bolivia.

References

 Stiefkens, L. B. 1984. Cromosomas gaméticos de Dalea elegans (Fabaceae). Kurtziana 17, pages 170–171

External links
 Dalea elegans at The Plant List
 Dalea elegans at Tropicos

elegans
Plants described in 1841
Flora of Argentina
Flora of Bolivia